Thylacoleonidae is a family of extinct meat-eating marsupials from Australia, referred to as marsupial lions. The best known is Thylacoleo carnifex, also called the marsupial lion. The clade ranged from the Late Oligocene to the Pleistocene, with some species the size of a possum and others as large as that of a leopard. As a whole, they were largely arboreal, in contrast to the mostly terrestrial dasyuromorphs (quolls only recently took the niches vacated by small thylacoleonids), monitor lizards and mekosuchines.

Hypercarnivory was also found in another order of marsupials, the dasyuromorph family Thylacinidae that included the Tasmanian tiger Thylacinus cynocephalus that became extinct in the twentieth century.

Description 

A diprotodontian family allied to the Vombatiformes, mammals that radiated and diversified in the Oligocene to Miocene. The thylacoleonid genera exhibit specialised dentition that allowed them to kill prey larger than themselves.

The earliest descriptions of the most recent species recognise the secateur-like blades of the teeth as a powerful mammalian predator, a "marsupial lion," that were noted as missing in the Australian environment. The third premolars exhibit this blade-like development, becoming greatly enlarged in the Pleistocene species Thylacoleo carnifex, prompting the description by Owen as "…one of the fellest and most destructive of predatory beasts." They are seen as presumably occupying a trophic level as peak predators in their local ecologies, some smaller and arboreal climbers while those terrestrial species are sizably comparable to large dog or a big cat.

Distribution and habitat 
The genera are associated with the late Oligocene and Miocene epochs. Microleo and Wakaleo have been located at the Lake Pitikanta fossil area in Central Australia and toward the northern coast at Riversleigh, below the gulf of Carpentaria, a rich source of fossil fauna. The most recent species, Thylacoleo carnifex, existed at least until the Pleistocene, the earliest known specimens of the family are dated to around twenty five million years ago.

Taxonomy 
The family was described by Theodore Gill in a systematic revision of mammalian taxa published by the Smithsonian Institution in 1872.
The name is derived from the genus named by Richard Owen, Thylacoleo, which he recognised as a potent carnivore and described as marsupial version of the modern lions (Leo).

They are now thought to be allied with the Vombatiformes, still represented in the modern Australian fauna by koalas and wombats. They appear to have diverged by specialising in a carnivorous diet in the early Oligocene, and increased in size along with their prey during the Miocene.

A revision of the family was published in 2017, enabled by the discovery of a skull of an early species, named as Wakaleo schouteni, which allowed closer comparison with previously described species and the more complete fossil record of the lineages. The study by Anna Gillespie, Mike Archer and Suzanne Hand, revised the description of Wakaleo to include a new species and circumscribe taxa previously assigned to Priscileo.

Classification
Five genera are currently accepted as belonging to this family:

 Genus Enigmaleo
 Enigmaleo archeri (Early Miocene)
 Genus Lekaneleo
 Lekaneleo myersi (Middle Miocene)
 Lekaneleo roskellyae (Early Miocene)
 Genus Microleo
 Microleo attenboroughi (Early Miocene)
 Subfamily Thylacoleoninae
 Genus Thylacoleo
 Thylacoleo crassidentatus (Pliocene)
 Thylacoleo hilli (Pliocene)
 Thylacoleo carnifex (Pleistocene)
 Subfamily Wakaleoninae
 Genus Wakaleo
 Wakaleo pitikantensis (Late Oligocene)
 Wakaleo schouteni (Late Oligocene—Early Miocene)
 Wakaleo oldfieldi (Early Miocene—Late Miocene)
 Wakaleo vanderleuri (Middle Miocene—Late Miocene)
 Wakaleo alcootaensis (Late Miocene)

References

Prehistoric vombatiforms
Carnivorous marsupials
Prehistoric mammals of Australia
Chattian first appearances
Pleistocene extinctions
Prehistoric mammal families